(also known by its English title "Put Your Camera Down") is a song by the Japanese band Tokyo Jihen. It was released on November 16, 2007, as a promotional track from their vinyl extended play Variety Zōkangō and music video clips DVD Senkō Shōjo, and was later added to their 2010 album Sports.

Background and development 

The song was released directly after Variety (2007), an album where the other band members other than Ringo Sheena served as the songwriters. The cover work is in the same style as Variety and its singles "OSCA" and "Killer-tune." Previously, Seiji Kameda had worked on the songs "Superstar" and "Tōmei Ningen" from Adult (2006), and "Shiseikatsu" from Variety.

Writing and production 

The song featured lyrics written by Ringo Sheena, and music by Seiji Kameda. It was recorded during sessions for Variety, and was performed during their Spa & Treatment tour in October and November 2007. It was originally titled  during demo sessions. Kameda was inspired to write the song after seeing a pre-teen girl walking home late at night, with her jacket hood up. Kameda wondered what her future would be like, and created the melody for the song. The first version recorded was "Put Your Camera Down," an English version with lyrics written by Robbie Clark That version was later featured on the Variety Zōkangō vinyl, as well as on the Senkō Shōjo DVD credits. It was eventually released to CD in 2013, on Tokyo Jihen's Hard Disk box set.

Promotion and release 

The song was used in commercials for Subaru's Stella cars from November 2007 onwards. The band performed the song at Music Station on November 30, 2007.

"Senkō Shōjo" is featured on Tokyo Jihen's Spa & Treatment live concert DVD, which was released on March 26, 2010. It was also performed during their Ultra C tour (released August 24, 2010), their Discovery tour (released February 25, 2012) and their farewell tour Bon Voyage (released on June 13, 2012). The band additionally performed the song at the Rising Sun Rock Festival (2008), Society of the Citizens Vol. 2 (2008), Countdown Japan (2009) and the Terebi Asahi Dream Music Festival (2011). The Spa & Treatment performance of the song was included on the live compilation album Tokyo Collection, released in 2012.

Critical reception 

CDJournal reviewers noted the song's "cheerful beat", and noted the song's message of appreciating the now. Listenmusic reviewer Yoshiki Aoyuki noted the song's as being simultaneously alternative rock and pop.

Track listing

Chart rankings

Certifications

Release history

References 

2007 songs
2007 singles
English-language Japanese songs
Japanese-language songs
Tokyo Jihen songs
Songs used as jingles
Songs written by Ringo Sheena
Songs written by Seiji Kameda
Music videos directed by Yuichi Kodama
EMI Music Japan singles